Bunia is the capital city of Ituri Province in the Democratic Republic of the Congo (DRC). It was part of the Orientale Province until that province's dissolution.

The city is at the center of the Ituri conflict between the Lendu and Hema. In the Second Congo War the city and district were the scene of much fighting and many civilian deaths from this conflict, and related clashes between militias and Uganda-based forces. Consequently, the city is the base of one of the largest United Nations peace-keeping forces in Africa, and its headquarters in northeastern DRC. The area's natural resources include gold mines over which militias and foreign forces have been fighting.

Climate 
Bunia has a tropical rainforest climate (Köppen Af) with warm, humid and wet conditions prevailing year-round.

Transport

The main dirt highways connecting north-eastern DR Congo with Kisangani to the west and Butembo and Goma to the south pass through Bunia, but have fallen into disrepair and are virtually impassable, especially after the frequent rains.

Bunia is only  from the Ugandan border running down Lake Albert, but there are no road connections across the Great Rift Valley to the closest Ugandan towns of Toro and Fort Portal. Instead a dirt highway going north-east reaches Arua and Gulu north of the lake. Before the war made the route impassable, this was the chief trade route between the DRC and Uganda,  as well between the DRC and Juba in South Sudan, and Bunia was an important market city, for cross-border trade as well as internal trade.

The supposed route of the Lagos-Mombasa Highway passes just to the south of Bunia, emphasising its potential as a centre of trade, but that transnational highway does not exist as a viable route through the DRC.

Bunia is linked to the small port of Kasenyi on Lake Albert by a  dirt track via Bogoro, which has a spectacular and dangerous 600-metre descent of the western escarpment of the Great Rift Valley. Kasenyi has a  jetty from which boat transport can link with Mahagi-Port at the north end of the lake, and with Butiaba and Ntoroko on the Eastern Lake Albert Shore (Ugandan side) and Pakwach on the Albert Nile.

Given the poor state of the roads, and the total lack of railway transport, Bunia Airport is of prime importance.

Demographics 
Projected to be the eighth fastest growing city on the African continent between 2020 and 2025, with a 5.63% growth.

Other features

The Shari River flows along the northwestern outskirts of the city. The Ituri River flows around 35 km west of Bunia.

Higher education
Bunia has a number of universities, the largest being the University of Bunia (UNIBU) followed by the private Université Shalom de Bunia (USB) which offers the largest library in Bunia (about 40,000 volumes) with an online catalog.

References

External links

 Detailed Map of Bunia
 Map of tribal areas of Ituri
 Congo's battle with disarmament, BBC, 9 June 2005
 Watch Equator, the BBC TV program featuring Bunia

 
Populated places in Ituri Province